Khovd Airport  is a public airport located in Khovd city, Mongolia.

Airlines and destinations

See also 
 List of airports in Mongolia

References

External links 
world-airport-codes.com Khovd
worldaerodata.com Khovd

Airports in Mongolia